This page provides an index of articles thought to be Internet or Web related topics.

A 
AARNet -
Abilene Network -
Access control list -
Ad hoc network -
Address resolution protocol -
ADSL -
AirPort -
All your base are belong to us -
AOL -
APNIC -
AppleTalk -
Application Configuration Access Protocol -
Archimedes Plutonium -
Archie search engine -
ARIN -
ASN.1 -
Asynchronous Transfer Mode -
Auction -
Authentication -
Automatic teller machine -
Autonomous system -
Awards

B 
Yahoo! Babel Fish -
Backbone cabal -
Base -
Bet exchange -
Biefeld-Brown effect -
Blank media tax -
Bogon filtering -
Bomb-making instructions on the internet -
Book -
Bookmark -
Border gateway protocol -
Broadband Integrated Services Digital Network -
Broadband Internet -
Bulletin board system

C 
Cable modem -
Carrier-sense multiple access -
Carrier-sense multiple access with collision detection -
Carrier-sense multiple access with collision avoidance -
CDDB -
Content-control software -
Chain letter -
Channel access method -
Charles Stark Draper Prize -
Cisco Systems, Inc. -
Classless Inter-Domain Routing -
Code Red worm -
Common Gateway Interface -
Communications protocol -
Component object model -
Computer -
Computer addiction -
Computer-assisted language learning -
computer network -
Computer worm -
Computing technology -
Concurrent Versions System -
Consumer privacy -
Content-control software -
Content delivery -
Coordinated Universal Time -
Core router -
CSMA/CARP -
Customer privacy -
Cyber law -
Cyberpunk -
Cybersex -
Cyberspace

D 
Darknet -
DDP -
Defense Advanced Research Projects Agency -
del.icio.us -
Delivermail -
Demilitarized zone (computing) -
Denial of service -
DHCP -
Dial-up -
Dial-up access -
DiffServ -
Digital divide -
Digital literacy -
Digital Equipment Corporation -
Digital subscriber line -
DirecTV -
DISH Network -
Disk image -
Distance-vector routing protocol -
DNS -
Domain forwarding -
Domain name registry -
DVB -
Dynamic DNS

E 
E-card -
E-democracy - 
E-mail -
E-Services -
EBay -
Eldred v. Ashcroft -
Electronic mailing list -
Electronic money -
Embrace, extend and extinguish -
End-to-end connectivity -
Enterprise content management -
Entropy -
Epoch -
Ethernet -
European Installation Bus -
EverQuest -
Everything2 -
Extended ASCII -
Extranet -

F 
Fan fiction -
FAQ -
Federal Standard 1037C -
Fiber optic -
Fidonet -
File sharing -
File transfer protocol -
Finger protocol -
Firefox -
Firewall -
Flaming -
Floppy disk -
Focus group -
Form -
FORscene -
Frame Relay -
FTP

G 
Gecko -
Geocaching -
G.hn -
GIMPS -
Global Internet usage - 
Glossary of Internet-related terminology -
GNU -
Gnutella -
Google -
Gopher protocol

H 
Hacker ethic -
Hate sites -
HDLC -
Head end -
Hierarchical routing -
High speed internet -
Hilary Rosen -
History of radio -
History of the Internet -
Homepage -
HomePNA -
Hop (telecommunications) -
HTML -
HTTP -
HTTPS -
Human–computer interaction

I 
ICANN -
ICQ -
Identity theft -
IEEE 802.11 -
IMAP -
IMAPS -
Indigenous Dialogues -
Infocom -
Information Age -
Information Awareness Office -
Instant messaging -
Integrated Services Digital Network -
Internet -
Internet access in the United States -
Internet Archive -
Internet as a source of prior art -
Internet backbone -
Internet Capitalization Conventions -
Internet censorship -
Internet censorship circumvention -
Internet Chess Club -
Internet child pornography -
Internet Control Message Protocol -
Internet democracy -
Internet Engineering Task Force -
Internet friendship -
Internet Group Management Protocol -
Internet minute -
Internet organizations -
Internet phone -
Internet pornography -
Internet Protocol -
Internet protocol suite -
Internet radio -
Internet-related terminology -
Internet Relay Chat -
Internet romance -
Internet service provider -
Internet slang -
Internet Society -
Internet standard -
Internet Storm Center -
Internet time -
Internet troll -
Internet2 -
Internetworking -
InterNIC -
Interpedia -
Interplanetary Internet -
InterWiki -
Intranet -
iOS -
IP address -
IP protocol -
IPv4 -
IPv6 -
IPX -
IRC -
ISCSI -
ISDN -
ISO 8601 -
ISO 8859-1

J 
JAIN -
James H. Clark -
Java applet -
Java platform -
JavaScript -
Jon Postel -
JPEG -
JSTOR

K 
KA9Q -
Knowledge Aided Retrieval in Activity Context -
Ken McVay -
Kerberos -
KNX

L 
LACNIC -
Large Technical System -
Larry Page -
Legal aspects of computing -
Lightweight Directory Access Protocol -
Link-state routing protocol -
Linux Network Administrators' Guide -
List of the oldest currently registered Internet domain names -
LiveJournal -
Load balancing -
Local area network -
Loopback -
Lycos

M 
Mailbomb -
Make money fast -
Matt Drudge -
Media player (application software) -
Medium -
Melissa worm -
MenuetOS -
Metcalfe's law -
Metropolitan area network -
Microsoft .NET -
Microsoft SQL Server -
Miller test -
Mirror -
Modem -
Modulation -
Morris worm -
Mozilla Firefox -
Mozilla Thunderbird -
MPEG-1 Audio Layer II -
Multichannel video programming distributor -
Multicast -
MUMPS
MYSPACE -

N 
Napster -
National Broadband Network -
NetBIOS -
Netiquette -
Netscape Communicator -
Netwar -
Network address translation -
Network Control Protocol -
Network File System -
Network Information Centre -
Network mapping -
Network News Transfer Protocol -
Network time protocol -
News agency -
News aggregator -
News client (newsreader) -
News server -
Non-repudiation -
Novell -
NSD -
NSFNet -
NTLM -
Nude celebrities on the Internet

O 
Online -
online banking -
Online Books Page -
Open mail relay -
Open Shortest Path First -
Open Site -
Opera (web browser) -
Organizations -
OS/390 -
OSI model -
OSPF -
Out-of-band data

P 
Packet radio -
Packet switching -
Parasitic computing -
Parental controls -
Paul Mockapetris -
Paul Vixie -
PayPal -
Peer-to-peer -
Peering -
Pen pal -
Perl -
Personal area network -
Ping -
PKZIP -
Plug-and-play -
Point-to-Point Protocol -
Political media -
POP -
POP3 -
Port forwarding -
Port scan -
Pretty Good Privacy -
Primary mirror -
Private IP address -
Project Gutenberg -
Protocol -
Protocol stack -
Pseudonymous remailer -
PSOS (real-time operating system) -
Psychological effects of Internet use -
Public switched telephone network -
Publishing

Q 
QNX -
QOTD -
Quality of service -
QuickTime

R 
Red Hat -
Regex -
Regulation of Investigatory Powers Act 2000 -
RPC -
Resource Reservation Protocol -
Request for Comments -
Reverse Address Resolution Protocol -
RIPE -
RISC OS -
Root nameserver -
Route analytics -
Router (computing) -
Routing -
Rooster Teeth -
Routing information protocol -
RSA -
RTP -
RTSP

S 
SCADA -
Scientology vs. the Internet -
scp -
Script kiddie -
Secret identity -
Secure copy -
Secure file transfer program -
Secure shell -
Sequenced packet exchange -
Sergey Brin -
Serial line IP -
Serial Line Internet Protocol -
Serial (podcast) -
SMB -
SFTP -
Signalling System 7 -
Simple Network Management Protocol -
Slashdot effect -
Smiley -
Simple File Transfer Protocol -
SMTP -
Social engineering (security) -
Social impact of YouTube -
Social media -
Software development kit -
Sohonet -
Spam -
SPX -
Spyware -
SQL slammer worm -
SSH -
SSH File Transfer Protocol -
Stateful firewall -
Stateless firewall -
Steganography -
Stub network

T 
TCP -
TCP and UDP port numbers -
Ted Nelson -
Telecommunication -
Telecommunications network -
Telecommunications traffic engineering -
Teledesic -
Telegraphy -
Teleprinter -
Telnet -
The Cathedral and the Bazaar -
Think tank -
Thunderbird -
Time to live -
Timeline of communication technology -
Timeline of computing 1950-1979 -
Timeline of computing 1980-1989 -
Tiscali -
Token Ring -
Top-level domain -
Traceroute -
Transmission Control Protocol -
Transmission system -
Transport Layer Security -
Trusted computing -
TTL

U 
UDDI -
Ubiquitous Knowledge Processing Lab -
Ultrix -
Ungermann-Bass -
Uniform Resource Identifier -
Uniform Resource Locator -
Universal Plug and Play -
University of California, Berkeley -
Usenet -
Usenet cabal -
USENET Cookbook -
User Datagram Protocol -
UTF-16 -
UUCP

V 
vCard -
Victorian Internet -
Vint Cerf -
Virtual community -
Voice over IP

W 
WAP - 
WAI -
War driving -
Warez -
Warhol worm -
WAV -
Web 2.0 -
Web annotation -
Web application -
Web browser -
Webcomic -
Web commerce -
Web design -
Web directory -
Web hosting -
Web index -
Web portal -
Web search engine -
Web server -
Web service -
Web traffic -
Web television -
Webcam -
WebDAV -
Webmail -
Webpage -
WebQuest -
Website -
Whois -
Wi-Fi -
Wide area information server -
Wide area network -
Wiki software -
Wikipedia -
WikiWikiWeb -
Windows 3.x -
Winsock -
Wireless access point -
Wireless Application Protocol -
Wireless broadband -
Wireless community network -
World Wide Web -
WorldForge

X 
X.25 -
XDR -
Xerox Network Systems -
XML -
XS4ALL

Y 
YTMND -
Yahoo! -
Yahoo! Internet Life

Z 
Zephyr

See also

 :Category:Computing terminology
 List of computing topics

Index
Internet